The following low-power television stations broadcast on digital or analog channel 22 in the United States:

 K22AD-D in Gillette, Wyoming
 K22BR-D in May, etc., Oklahoma
 K22CI-D in Lander, Wyoming
 K22CQ-D in Idalia, Colorado
 K22CU-D in Cortez, etc., Colorado
 K22DM-D in Rural Summit County, Utah
 K22DR-D in Laughlin, Nevada
 K22EW-D in Mora, New Mexico
 K22FH-D in Hawthorne, Nevada
 K22FN-D in White Oaks, etc., New Mexico
 K22FS-D in Beaver, etc., Utah
 K22FW-D in Mount Pleasant, Utah
 K22GE-D in Dulce, New Mexico
 K22GM-D in Battle Mountain, Nevada
 K22GW-D in Wells, Nevada
 K22GX-D in Tri City, Oregon
 K22HO-D in Cottage Grove, Oregon
 K22HS-D in Eureka Springs, Arkansas
 K22ID-D in Alva - Cherokee, Oklahoma
 K22IE-D in Navajo Mtn. Sch., etc., Utah
 K22IF-D in Oljeto, Utah
 K22IG-D in Mexican Hat, Utah
 K22IK-D in Rexburg, etc., Idaho
 K22IL-D in Prineville, etc., Oregon
 K22IM-D in Challis, Idaho
 K22IP-D in Virgin, Utah
 K22IQ-D in Cave Junction, Oregon
 K22IX-D in Mayfield, Utah
 K22IY-D in Big Piney, Wyoming
 K22JA-D in Corpus Christi, Texas
 K22JC-D in Silver Springs, Nevada
 K22JF-D in Stemilt, etc., Washington
 K22JG-D in Green River, Utah
 K22JI-D in Huntington, Utah
 K22JM-D in Gunnison, Colorado
 K22JN-D in Grand Junction, Colorado
 K22JQ-D in Ardmore, Oklahoma
 K22JR-D in Turkey, Texas
 K22JS-D in Ashland, Oregon
 K22JY-D in Truth or Consequences, New Mexico
 K22JZ-D in Spring Glen, Utah
 K22KB-D in Ely, etc., Nevada
 K22KC-D in The Dalles, Oregon
 K22KD-D in Sioux Falls, South Dakota
 K22KS-D in Libby, Montana
 K22KU-D in Redwood Falls, Minnesota
 K22KW-D in Julesburg, Colorado
 K22KY-D in Poplar, Montana
 K22LD-D in Chinook, Montana
 K22LE-D in Cedarville, California
 K22LJ-D in Mason City, Iowa
 K22LR-D in Collbran, Colorado
 K22LY-D in Baker Valley, Oregon
 K22LZ-D in Hollis, Oklahoma
 K22MA-D in Elk City, Oklahoma
 K22MB-D in Roseburg, Oregon
 K22MD-D in Anderson/Central Valley, California
 K22ME-D in Deming, New Mexico
 K22MG-D in Woods Bay, Montana
 K22MH-D in Logan, Utah
 K22MI-D in Drummond, Montana
 K22MJ-D in Hinsdale, Montana
 K22MM-D in Garfield County, Utah
 K22MN-D in Fort Peck, Montana
 K22MO-D in Pateros, Washington
 K22MP-D in Richfield, etc., Utah
 K22MQ-D in St. James, Minnesota
 K22MR-D in Virginia, Minnesota
 K22MT-D in Idabel, Oklahoma
 K22MU-D in Circleville, Utah
 K22MV-D in Teasdale, Utah
 K22MW-D in Panguitch, Utah
 K22MX-D in Henrieville, Utah
 K22MY-D in Jackson, Minnesota
 K22NA-D in Inyokern, etc., California
 K22NB-D in Kanarraville etc., Utah
 K22NC-D in Scipio/Holden, Utah
 K22ND-D in Willmar, Minnesota
 K22NE-D in Myton, Utah
 K22NF-D in Orangeville, Utah
 K22NG-D in Eureka, Nevada
 K22NI-D in Leesville, Louisiana
 K22NJ-D in Lucerne, Wyoming
 K22NK-D in Lake Havasu City, Arizona
 K22NM-D in Las Cruces, New Mexico
 K22NN-D in Forsyth, Montana
 K22NO-D in Tulia, Texas
 K22NP-D in Shiprock, New Mexico
 K22NQ-D in Holbrook, Idaho
 K22NR-D in Stephenville, Texas
 K22NT-D in Aztec, New Mexico
 K22NU-D in Golconda, Nevada
 K22NV-D in Malad City, Idaho
 K22NW-D in Boulder, Colorado
 K22NX-D in Juliaetta, Idaho
 K22OB-D in Medford, Oregon
 K22OC-D in Fort Smith, Arkansas
 K22OG-D in Fargo, North Dakota
 K22OH-D in Helena, Montana
 K22OI-D in Carbondale, Colorado
 K22OK-D in Waco, Texas
 K22OO-D in Nephi, Utah
 K22OQ-D in Fort Jones, etc., California
 K22OV-D in Caputa, South Dakota
 K22OW-D in Alexandria, Louisiana
 K38EC-D in Eagles Nest, New Mexico
 K47NW-D in International Falls, Minnesota
 K48DV-D in Alexandria, Minnesota
 K49KX-D in Orderville, Utah
 K49LO-D in Red Lake, Minnesota
 KAXT-CD in San Francisco-San Jose, California
 KCPQ (DRT) in Tacoma, Washington
 KDCG-CD in Opelousas, Louisiana
 KEQI-LD in Dededo, Guam
 KFXF-LD in Fairbanks, Alaska
 KGSW-LD in Keene, Texas
 KHPN-LD in Warrenton, Oregon
 KHTV-CD in Los Angeles, California
 KISA-LD in San Antonio, Texas
 KJHP-LD in Morongo Valley, California
 KJNE-LD in Jonesboro, Arkansas
 KLEW-TV in Moscow, Idaho
 KLFB-LD in Salinas, California
 KLKW-LD in Amarillo, Texas
 KMDF-LD in Midland, Texas
 KMJC-LD in Kansas City, Kansas
 KMYL-LD in Lubbock, Texas
 KNAV-LD in Dallas, Texas
 KPDF-CD in Phoenix, Arizona
 KPDR-LD in Salt Lake City, Utah
 KPSN-LD in Payson, Arizona
 KRID-LD in Boise, Idaho
 KTLM in Harlingen/Rio Grande City, Texas
 KTOU-LD in Oklahoma City, Oklahoma
 KTXE-LD in San Angelo, Texas
 KUMY-LD in Beaumont, Texas
 KUWB-LD in Bloomington, Utah
 KWBJ-CD in Morgan City, Louisiana
 KWBJ-LD in Morgan City, Louisiana
 KXLY-TV in Spokane, Washington
 KYES-LD in Anchorage, Alaska
 KZAB-LP in Abilene, Texas
 KZHD-LD in Rohnert Park, California
 KZVU-LD in Chico, California
 W22CV-D in Moorefield, West Virginia
 W22CY-D in Clarksburg, West Virginia
 W22DO-D in Utica, New York
 W22EL-D in Vanderbilt, Michigan
 W22EN-D in Manteo, North Carolina
 W22EP-D in Starkville, Mississippi
 W22EX-D in Staunton, Virginia
 W22FA-D in Mayaguez, Puerto Rico
 W22FB-D in Marion, North Carolina
 W22FC-D in Greenville, North Carolina
 W22FH-D in Fort Wayne, Indiana
 W22FN-D in Wilmington, North Carolina
 W41BQ in Asheville, North Carolina
 WARP-CD in Tampa-St. Petersburg, Florida
 WBLZ-LD in Syracuse, New York
 WBOC-LD in Cambridge, Maryland
 WCBS-TV (DRT) in Riverhead, New York
 WCKV-LD in Clarksville, Tennessee
 WCTD-LD in Ducktown, Tennessee
 WCTU-LD in Pensacola, Florida
 WDES-CD in Destin, Florida
 WDNM-LD in Memphis, Tennessee
 WDVB-CD in Edison, New Jersey
 WDWO-CD in Detroit, Michigan
 WEBU-LD in Water Valley, Mississippi
 WEEL-LD in Tuscaloosa, Alabama
 WFGZ-LD in Lake City, Florida
 WFVX-LD in Bangor, Maine
 WJAC-TV in Altoona, Pennsylvania
 WKNX-LD in Pinconning, Michigan
 WKPT-CD in Kingsport, Tennessee
 WMNS-LD in Charlotte Amalie, U.S. Virgin Islands
 WOCB-CD in Marion, Ohio
 WPFN-CD in Panama City, Florida
 WPHY-CD in Trenton, New Jersey
 WSJN-CD in San Juan, Puerto Rico
 WSPA-TV (DRT) in Anderson, South Carolina
 WSWH-LD in Tuscaloosa, Alabama
 WTAE-TV (DRT) in Pittsburgh, Pennsylvania
 WTNO-CD in New Orleans, Louisiana
 WTOO-CD in Bolivar, Pennsylvania
 WTOO-LD in Clearfield, Pennsylvania
 WUBF-LD in Jacksonville, Florida
 WUTH-CD in Hartford, Connecticut
 WVDM-LD in Quincy, Illinois
 WVEB-LD in Florence, South Carolina
 WVMA-CD in Winchendon, Massachusetts
 WWKH-CD in Uniontown, Pennsylvania

The following low-power stations, which are no longer licensed, formerly broadcast on analog or digital channel 22:
 K22DE in Tooele, Utah
 K22DO-D in Granite Falls, Minnesota
 K22EC-D in Juab, Utah
 K22EE in Morro Bay, California
 K22EU in Montoya, New Mexico
 K22FC-D in Grants Pass, Oregon
 K22FX in Orangeville, etc., Utah
 K22GT in Lake Charles, Louisiana
 K22HB in Mammoth Lakes, California
 K22HG in St. Charles, Missouri
 K22IT in Provo, Utah
 K22JD-D in Madera Peak, Arizona
 K22JK-D in Moses Lake, Washington
 K22JU-D in Rapid City, South Dakota
 K22LB-D in Squaw Valley, Oregon
 KEAT-LP in Amarillo, Texas
 KPAO-LP in Paso Robles, California
 KWHY-LP in Santa Barbara, California
 W22BN in Danbury, Connecticut
 W22CJ in Jacksonville, North Carolina
 W22DA in Frederick, Maryland
 W22DE in Dayton, Ohio
 WBLP-LP in Ocean City, Maryland
 WDQB-LD in Wilmington, North Carolina
 WDTJ-LP in Toledo, Ohio
 WEQA-LD in Florence, South Carolina
 WJZC-LP in Sevierville, Tennessee
 WQDS-LD in Athens, Georgia

References

22 low-power